The giant Fijian long-horned beetle (Xixuthrus ) is native to the island of Viti Levu in Fiji, and is one of the largest living insect species, with specimens around 15 cm long, excluding legs, antennae, or jaws. It is closely related to the Taveuni beetle, which is only marginally smaller. These beetles have powerful jaws, and should be handled with care when alive—when threatened, they produce a loud and fearsome hissing noise by squeezing air out from under their elytra. Various websites and other resources incorrectly indicate that this species is extinct; it is not, though the forest habitat on its home island is somewhat limited, so the beetle is potentially quite vulnerable.

In fact, X.  is considered common in the highlands of Viti Levu where the forest is intact; natives in remote villages continue to consume the larvae. Adults commonly come to lights near the nursing college near Suva.

References

External links
 
 
Xixuthrus heros pictures
ZinRus In Russian but excellent images of several members of this genus including X. heros. Locality information in English.

Prioninae
Insects of Fiji
Endemic fauna of Fiji
Beetles described in 1868